Luere B. Deasy (February 8, 1859 – March 1940) was an American lawyer, judge and politician from Maine. Deasy, a Republican from Bar Harbor, served two terms in the Maine Senate (1907-1910), including one as Senate President (1909-1910).  He was appointed by Governor Carl Milliken as a justice of the Maine Supreme Judicial Court to a seat vacated by the resignation of George E. Bird, serving thereafter from September 25, 1918, to February 7, 1930.

Deasy was originally from Gouldsboro, Maine and graduated from Eastern State Normal School in Castine, Maine and Boston University School of Law. In religion he was a Unitarian. As a practicing lawyer starting in 1886, Deasy was noted for his persuasiveness.

References

People from Bar Harbor, Maine
Presidents of the Maine Senate
Justices of the Maine Supreme Judicial Court
Eastern State Normal School alumni
American Unitarians
Boston University School of Law alumni
Maine lawyers
1859 births
1940 deaths